The Mack B series is a model line of trucks produced by Mack Trucks between 1953 and 1966.  The successor to the 1940-1956 Mack L series, the B-series was a line of heavy conventional-cab trucks.  Adopting a more streamlined appearance over its predecessor, the B-series was designed with a sloped windshield and larger, rounded fenders  The model line was sold in multiple configurations, including tractors and straight/rigid trucks, cowled chassis (delivery body or bus), or fire trucks.        

The B-series was the first Mack truck produced with a diesel engine, introducing the Mack-produced Thermodyne inline-6 in 1953.  

During 1966, Mack replaced the B-series with the Mack R-series, which lasted into the 21st century.  In total, 126,745 examples of the B-series were produced over 13 years.

Model numbers & letters
Chassis model designations:
B1x -
B2x -
B3x -
B4x -
B5x -
B6x -
B7x -
B8x -
B9x - 

Chassis letter guide:
B  - school bus chassis
C - flat face cowl for the addition of a delivery body
E - built for export
F - fire truck chassis
L - light weight or weight reduced by using aluminum components
P - platform chassis  (single axle straight truck)
R - right hand drive. This designation was started in 1964 but right hand drive available
S - six wheel chassis  (tandem axle)
T - tractor chassis
X - severe or extreme service chassis

Engines

A wide range of diesels were also offered. From the B61 up to the ENDT 673 turbocharged I6 and END 864 V8 were offered. From the B73 up to the Cummins  I6s up to the NTC335 were available.

The table shows the largest gasoline and diesel engines in the series.

(Type: G=gasoline, D=diesel, TD=turbocharged diesel)

See also
Mack Trucks
List of Mack Trucks Products

References

External links

Antique Mack truck forum
Site specializing in B model information

B
Vehicles introduced in 1953